Dr Fahmida Hussain (maiden name Fahmida Memon)  was born in a literary family on July 5, 1948, in Tando Jam in district Hyderabad Sindh, Pakistan. Her father Mohammad Yakoon "Niaz" was also a scholar who had translated poetry of Hafiz Shirazi from Persian to Sindhi language. Her brother Sirajul Haq Memon was also a well-known author and researcher. She is a well-known author, scholar, linguist and intellectual of Pakistan. Her fields of work have been: Literature, Linguistics, Woman studies and Anthropology. Her specialization is in the study of the great classical mystic poet Shah Abdul Latif Bhittai. Dr Fahmida was the Chairperson of Sindhi Language Authority from May 2008 to March 2015. Before that she had served as Director of Shah Abdul Latif Chair, University of Karachi for ten years. Prior to that she had also served as Professor and Chairperson of the Department of Sindhi in the same university.
Dr Fahmida Hussain is a prolific writer who has more than 15 books to her credit along with several research articles on the subjects of Literary Criticism, Linguistics with special reference to different aspects of Sindhi language, poetry of Shah Abdul Latif Bhittai and gender issues. She started writing short stories and poetry from a very young age and has to her credit one book of short stories as well. She has been writing columns, articles and critiques in various newspapers and magazines from the last 40 years. She is married to Abdul Hussain and they have 3 children. Dr Sunita Hussain, Aruna Hussain and a son Shahmir Hussain.

Education
Dr Fahmida Hussain did her early schooling from Model School in Hyderabad, Sindh, and completed her graduation in 1968 from D. J. Science College in Karachi. She pursued master's degree in English in 1970 from the Department of English at  University of Sindh in Hyderabad, and another Masters in Sindhi in 1972 from the same university.

In 1990 she completed a Diploma course in Hindi language from the Department of General History at the University of Karachi. Further on, in 1992, she successfully completed her doctors thesis in Sindhi literature to obtain a Ph.D.

Fahmida Hussain also obtained a Bachelor of Law degree (LLB) in 1981.

Career
In 1972 Dr Fahmida Hussain was appointed Lecturer of English at the Institute of Education at the University of Sindh, a post she held until 1975. From 1978 to 1988 she taught as lecturer of Sindhi at the University of Karachi. In 1988 she was appointed as assistant professor, a post she held until 1995 when she was appointed a full Professor, and later also chairperson of the department in 1997.

In the year 1998 Dr Fahmida Hussain accepted the position of Director, Shah Abdul Latif Bhittai Chair at the University of Karachi. In May 2008, Dr Hussain was appointed to the coveted and prestigious post of chairperson, Sindhi Language Authority.

During all these years starting from 1968 to date, Dr Fahmida Hussain has been writing in Sindhi, Urdu and English on various fronts: as a columnist, editor, researcher, translator, author and linguist. Dr Hussain serves as a member on the boards of a number of important educational institutions in the country.

Currently she retired from the post of chairperson of Sindhi language Authority (SLA), Sindh

She has also received a number of awards and recognition for her work and contribution.

Books published
She has written several books on literature, Language engineering and on Shah Abdul Latif Bhittai's poetry. Here is a list of books on credit of her:
(2012)	Sindhu Likhat-21st  Sadi-a Men Thial Tahqique(Translation of research articles on Indus Script), Sindhi Language Authority Hyderabad 
(2012)	Adyoon Aaoon Anjaan, (Articles on the poetry of Shah Latif)- Culture Department, Govt. of Sindh, Karachi
(2012)	Sindhi Boli-Lisani Pahloo  (Essays on Sindhi Language), Sindhi Language Authority, Hyderabad, Sindh
(2011)	Sindhi Boli-a ji Sikhya (Devnagari), Sindhi Language Authority, Hyderabad, Sindh 
(2011)	Aaiye Sindhi Seekhen  (Let Us Learn Sindhi with CD)- Sindhi Language Authority, Hyderabad, Sindh 
(2008)	Shah Abdul Latif Bhitai-(Life, Poetry & Philosophy in Urdu),  Pakistan Academy of Letters, Islamabad.
(2006)	Duniya Joon Shair Aurtoon ( Sindhi translation of Poetry of Women Poets of the World)- Sindhi Adabi Board, Jamshoro. 
(2003)	Hik Hawa Kaen Kahanyoon (Collection of short stories), Sachal Academy, Karachi. 
(2002)	Image of Woman in the Poetry of Shah Latif, (English Translation)  Shah Abdul Latif Bhitai Chair, University of Karachi, Karachi 
(2002)	Adabi Tanqeed-Fan ain Tareekh (Literary Criticism-Art and History), Naoon Nyapo Academy, Karachi. 
(2000)	Bar-e-Sagheer Ji Bolian Jo Lisanianti Jaizo (Sindhi translation of Linguistic Survey of India, Volume VIII, Part 1, by George Grierson), Sindhi Language Authority, Hyderabad. 
(1996)	Shah Latif ki Shairi Mein Aurat ka Roop (Urdu translation ) Bhit Shah Cultural Committee, Hyderabad. 
(1993)	Shah Latif Ji Shairi Mein Aurat Jo Roop (Image of Woman in the Poetry of Shah Latif), Bhit Shah Cultural Committee, Hyderabad.
(1990)	Pir Hisamuddin Rashidi- A Biography, Sindh Culture & Tourism Department, Karachi.
(1983)	Hawaun Je Adhar- Travelogue, Agam Publishers, Hyderabad.

Awards
 2004: President's Pride of Performance 
 2004: Pakistan Academy of Letters Award 
 2003: Latif Award for Outstanding work in Research & Publications
 2000: Sahyog Foundation Award for best Sindhi Writer of Sindh 
 1995: Sindh Graduates Association Award in Research & Writing 
 1994: Hijra Award 1414, Pakistan Academy of Letters 
 1994: Sindhi Adabi Sangat Award for Best Research on Shah Latif's Poetry & Women Studies

References

External links
 https://web.archive.org/web/20080819184811/http://www.presidentofpakistan.gov.pk/NationalAwards.aspx 
 https://web.archive.org/web/20080527221947/http://www.sindhtoday.net/world/328.htm 
 http://www.uok.edu.pk/faculties/sindhi/index.php
 Dawn Review: Profile on Fahmida Hussain (1999)  
 Shah Latif Chair Publications  
 Dawn, June 5, 2008: Dr Fahmida appointed SLA Chairperson 

1948 births
Living people
Sindhi people
Pakistani scholars
Pakistani women writers
Sindhi-language writers
University of Karachi alumni
University of Sindh alumni
Academic staff of the University of Karachi
Academic staff of the University of Sindh
Sindhi female writers
Recipients of Latif Award